Thijs Dekker (born 31 January 1997) is a Dutch professional footballer who plays for WHC Wezep, as a midfielder.

Career
Dekker left Go Ahead Eagles on 1 September 2018 where his contract was terminated by mutual consent, and was without club until 18 January 2019 when he signed with WHC Wezep.

References

External links
 

1997 births
Living people
Dutch footballers
Go Ahead Eagles players
WHC Wezep players
Eerste Divisie players
Association football midfielders
Footballers from Deventer